José Joaquín Pesado Pérez (Palmar de Bravo, Puebla, New Spain, 9 February 1801 — Mexico City, 3 March 1861) was a Mexican writer, journalist, poet and politician. He was born in San Agustín del Palmar, Puebla, in 1801 and died in Mexico City in 1861. In 1822, he married María de la Luz de la Llave y Segura, and Juana Segura Argüelles twenty years later.

Pesado was Secretariat of Foreign Affairs (es:Secretario de Relaciones Exteriores, Gobernación y Policía), Interior Minister (es: Ministerio del Interior), Foreign minister (es:Ministro de Relaciones Exteriores), and Governor of Veracruz (es: Gobernador de Veracruz). He joined the nineteenth-century literary society the Academia de Letrán. He was also a member of the Academia Mexicana de la Lengua and professor of philosophy. He published in El Radical and El Año Nuevo. He was editor of El Mosaico Mexicano, El Recreo de las familias, El Nuevo Año and La Cruz.

References

External links 

 José Joaquín Pesado Academia Mexicana de la Lengua
 Los cancilleres de México a través de su historia Secretaría de Relaciones Exteriores de México.
 Estudio sobre José Joaquín Pesado
 Poemas de José Joaquín Pesado
 Obras de Pesado, José Joaquín, 1801-1861 

1801 births
1861 deaths
Mexican writers
Writers from Puebla
Governors of Veracruz
Members of the Mexican Academy of Language
Mexican Secretaries of the Interior
Mexican Secretaries of Foreign Affairs